Habsburg Serbia may refer to several periods and territories in the history of Serbia:

 Habsburg-occupied Serbia (1686–1691), temporary Habsburg occupation of central Serbia (1686–1691)
 Kingdom of Serbia (1718–1739), crown land of the Habsburg Empire (1718-1739)
 Habsburg-occupied Serbia (1788–1791), temporary Habsburg occupation of central Serbia (1788–1791)
 Serbian Vojvodina, Serbian region in Habsburg Empire (1848-1849) 
 Voivodeship of Serbia and Banat of Temeschwar, crown land of the Habsburg Empire (1849-1860) 
 Austro-Hungarian occupation of Serbia, Habsburg-occupied Serbia (1915-1918)

See also

 Serbia (disambiguation)
 Ottoman Serbia (disambiguation)
 Moravian Serbia (disambiguation)